The Women's Caucus is a caucus of female-identified members of the New York City Council. According to the Caucus, it seeks "to advance women's rights and promotes the goal of equality in New York CIty through influences in public policy through education, legislation, and advocacy." The Caucus submits an annual list of funding priority recommendations to the New York City Council Speaker's office so that the budget will address the needs of organizations serving the Caucus' constituencies.

Current members

Activity 
In May 2013, the Caucus introduced a resolution at a New York City Council meeting calling for  Harriet Tubman to replace Andrew Jackson on the twenty-dollar bill, which was part of a larger nationwide initiative organized by a nonprofit called "Women on 20s".

In November 2016, the Caucus presented a legislative package of 11 bills and resolutions to the New York City Council addressing equal rights and opportunities for women. Issues addressed in the package included the needs of unpaid caregivers, access to feminine hygiene products, services for victims of domestic violence and sexual assault, the gender pay gap, as well as others.

References

External links 
 Official website
 http://observer.com/2016/11/councils-womens-caucus-unveils-legislative-equality-package-for-the-age-of-trump/

New York City Council
Issue-based groups of legislators
Women's rights organizations